This is a table of the electoral results of the Portuguese Communist Party. Despite the Party had been founded in 1921, the party experienced little time as a legal party, being forced into clandestinity after a military coup in 1926. In the following decades, Portugal was dominated by the dictatorial regime led by António Oliveira Salazar, that kept the Party illegal. Although the regime allowed elections during some periods, the Party, given its illegal status, could never legally enter the electoral process and the heavy manipulation of the electoral results never allowed a democratic candidate to win. The regime would only end in 1974, with the Carnation Revolution, that implemented broad democratic changes in the country.

Since then, four types of elections are held with different periodicity. The head of state, the President of the Republic, is elected for a five-year term, the Parliament is elected for a four-year term, like the municipal administrations, that since 1985, are also elected for a four-year term. Azores and Madeira elect a regional parliament each four years. Along with these, European elections are also held with a periodicity of five years since the country joined the European Union in 1986.

Since the revolution, the Party participated in every election, from the late 1970s until 1987, it ran in coalition with the Portuguese Democratic Movement in the United People Alliance (APU). In 1987, the APU was disbanded and since then, the Party participated in coalition with the Ecologist Party "The Greens" (PEV) inside the Unitary Democratic Coalition (CDU). The peak of the Party's electoral influence was from the Carnation Revolution until the early 1980s, since then, and mainly after the fall of the Socialist bloc in eastern Europe, the Party's electoral success was reduced, however, it still keeps a presence in the Parliament and still holds the presidency of 18 municipalities and several parishes.

Results

Results in parliamentary elections

Note:

 The 1975 elections was the Portuguese Constituent Assembly election, as such it is not counted as a regular parliamentary election.
 In brackets is the number of MPs elected by the PCP in the total elected by CDU.
 In 1991 the overall number of MPs changed from the original 250 to 230.
 In the 2022 legislative election all the elected members from the CDU lists were PCP members.

Results in local elections

Note:

The Local election results report the voting for the Municipal Chambers only and don't include occasional coalitions in some municipalities, e.g. in Lisbon, between 1989 and 2001. Voting for the Municipal Assemblies and Parish Assemblies is usually higher (11.7% and 12.0%, respectively, in 2005).
 The mayor of Setúbal since 2021 is a member of the PEV, another party from the CDU electoral coalition. The remaining 18 elected mayors are members of the PCP.

Results in European Parliament elections
These are the results for Unitary Democratic Coalition, composed of the PCP, the PEV and the ID.

(source: Portuguese Electoral Commission) 

Note:

 In 2004, after the enlargement of the European Union, the number of MEPs elected by Portugal decreased from the original 25 to 24, to 22 in 2009 and it further decreased to 21 in 2014.

Coalitions Info:

 The FEPU was composed of the PCP, the MDP/CDE and the FSP;
 The APU was composed of the PCP and the MDP/CDE, later it included the PEV;
 The CDU is composed of the PCP and the PEV.

Results in presidential elections

Notes:

 In 1980, Carlos Brito withdrew in favour of Ramalho Eanes.
 In 1986, the Party's first candidate was Ângelo Veloso, that later withdrew in favour of Salgado Zenha.
 In 1986, in the second round, the Party supported Mário Soares.
 In 1996, Jerónimo de Sousa withdrew in favour of Jorge Sampaio.

See also
Portuguese Communist Party
History of the Portuguese Communist Party
History of Portugal
Carnation Revolution

References

External links
In Portuguese:
Portuguese Communist Party official web site
History section of the Party's official website
Avante Festival! official website
Avante! newspaper online edition
PCP's short biography by the Carnation Revolution archive center

In English:
Portuguese Communist Party web site
Portuguese Communist Party program

Portuguese Communist Party
Communist Party
Portuguese Communist Party